Freya is an Old Norse feminine given name derived from the name of the Old Norse word for noble lady (Freyja). The theonym of the goddess Freyja is thus considered to have been an epithet in origin, replacing a personal name that is now unattested. 

Freya, along with its variants, has been a popular name in recent years in English-speaking countries, Germany, and Scandinavian countries.

Notable people 

Freya Allan, English actress
Freya Anderson, English freestyle swimmer
Freya Aswynn, Dutch neopagan
Freya Blackwood, Australian Illustrator 
Freja Beha Erichsen, Danish model
Audrey Freyja Clarke, Icelandic figure skater
Freya Clausen, Danish singer/songwriter known also by the mononym Freya
Freya Hoffmeister, German sea kayaker
Freya Klier, German author and film director
Freya Lim, Taiwanese singer
Freya Manfred, American poet
Freya Mathews, Australian philosopher and author
Freya Mavor (born 1993), Scottish actress and model
Freya North, English novelist
Freya Piryns, Belgian politician
Freya Ridings, English singer-songwriter
Freya Ross, Scottish long-distance runner
Freya Stafford, Australian actress
Freya Stark (1893–1993), Anglo-Italian explorer and travel writer
Freya Tingley, Australian actress
Freya Van den Bossche, Belgian Flemish politician
Freya von Moltke (1911–2010), German anti-Nazi resistance group member

References

Feminine given names
Old Norse personal names